Sadhu Daya Singh Arif (1894–1945) was a Punjabi poet, theologian and balladeer.

Personal life 
Daya Singh was born into Mazhabi Sikh community to Santa Singh at Punjab, British India.

Career 
He read wide range of secular literature and as also reached the stage of ‘brahmgiani’ through meditation and contemplation like Sadhu Wazir Singh which is apparent from his assuming the title of ‘Arif’.

His book, Atam Hamrahi, is one of prominent among Punjabi Dalit literature.

References 

Punjabi-language poets
Indian theologians
1894 births
1945 deaths
Punjabi musicians